The Kasrık mine is a large mine in the south-east of Turkey in Mardin Province 743 km south-east of the capital, Ankara. Kasrık represents one of the largest phosphates reserve in Turkey having estimated reserves of 110 million tonnes of ore grading 25% P2O5.

References

External links 
 Official site

Phosphate mines in Turkey
Buildings and structures in Mardin Province
Mining in Turkey